This article shows the rosters of all participating teams at the 2015 FIVB Volleyball Men's World Cup in Japan.

The following is the Argentine roster in the 2015 FIVB Volleyball Men's World Cup.

Head coach: Julio Velasco

The following is the Australian roster in the 2015 FIVB Volleyball Men's World Cup.

Head coach:  Roberto Santilli

The following is the Canadian roster in the 2015 FIVB Volleyball Men's World Cup.

Head coach: Glenn Hoag

The following is the Egyptian roster in the 2015 FIVB Volleyball Men's World Cup.

Head coach: Nehad Shehata

The following is the Iranian roster in the 2015 FIVB Volleyball Men's World Cup.

Head coach: Slobodan Kovac

The following is the Italian roster in the 2015 FIVB Volleyball Men's World Cup.

Head coach: Gianlorenzo Blengini

The following is the Japanese roster in the 2015 FIVB Volleyball Men's World Cup.

Head coach: Masashi Nambu

The following is the Polish roster in the 2015 FIVB Volleyball Men's World Cup.

Head coach:  Stephane Antiga

The following is the Russian roster in the 2015 FIVB Volleyball Men's World Cup.

Head coach: Vladimir Alekno

The following is the Tunisian roster in the 2015 FIVB Volleyball Men's World Cup.

Head coach: Fathi Mkaouar

The following is the United States roster in the 2015 FIVB Volleyball Men's World Cup.

Head coach:  John Speraw

The following is the Venezuelan roster in the 2015 FIVB Volleyball Men's World Cup.

Head coach:  Vincenzo Nacchi

See also
2015 FIVB Volleyball Women's World Cup squads

References

External links
Official website

squads
FIVB Volleyball Men's World Cup squads
Volleyball qualification for the 2016 Summer Olympics